"The Father, the Son, and the Holy Guest Star" is the twenty-first and the last episode of the sixteenth season of the American animated television series The Simpsons. It originally aired on the Fox network in the United States on May 15, 2005. Originally supposed to air April 10, the episode was dropped from the week's schedule due to the death of Pope John Paul II, since this episode revolved around Catholicism. This episode is also the 350th episode in production order (in broadcast order, "Future-Drama" is the 350th episode).

Plot
After Bart is expelled from school after being blamed for Groundskeeper Willie's prank unleashing hundreds of rats during the school's medieval festival, Marge enrolls him in St. Jerome's Catholic School, where Bart's rebel attitude is frowned upon. Bart meets a sympathetic Father Sean, who gives him a comic book about saints, and he is drawn into it. Marge becomes concerned over Bart's interest in the Catholic Church, due to the Catholic ban on birth control. Homer goes to the school to confront Sean, but decides to convert to Catholicism as well for easy absolution of his sins. With Bart and Homer considering joining the Church, Marge seeks help from Rev. Lovejoy and Ned Flanders, who agree to get them back.

On the road, Marge, Ned and Lovejoy try to bring Bart back to the "one true faith" – The Western Branch of American Reform Presbylutheranism – by taking him to a Protestant Youth Festival where Marge bribes him with rock music and paintball. Alerted by Lisa, who agrees with Homer and Bart's desire to join a new faith, Homer and Sean arrive there with a motorcycle, and engage in a Mexican standoff with Ned and Lovejoy. Bart mocks the feuds between the different forms of Christianity, explaining that the topics they disagree on are nothing compared to the topics they agree on. The two groups agree to fight monogamist gays and stem cells, taking Bart's idea to heart.

The episode then jumps 1,000 years into the future, when Bart is believed to be the last Prophet of God. Mankind is waging war over whether Bart's teachings were about love and tolerance, or understanding and peace (and whether he was betrayed by Milhouse). Engaging in a bloody battle, one side cries Bart's catchphrase "Eat my shorts", the other cries "Cowabunga".

Reception
Robert Canning, Eric Goldman, Dan Iverson, and Brain Zormski of IGN called this episode the best episode of the sixteenth season. They thought of it as a great episode that dealt with the sensitive topic of religious tolerance, stating that "with a daring story, we can't help but remember when The Simpsons was an edgy hip show that would frequently shed a light on cultural complexes". They thought it would be ideal if there were more episodes like this one.

L'Osservatore Romano, the daily broadsheet of the Vatican, praised the episode for taking up issues such as Christian faith and religion.

Matt Warburton was nominated for a Writers Guild of America Award for Outstanding Writing in Animation at the 58th Writers Guild of America Awards for his script to this episode.

References

External links

 "The Father, the Son, and the Holy Guest Star" at the Internet Movie Database

The Simpsons (season 16) episodes
2005 American television episodes
Fiction set in the 4th millennium
Television episodes about Catholicism